The Nesheim Bridge near McVille, North Dakota is a Pratt through truss structure that was built in 1904 to cross the Sheyenne River.  It was listed on the National Register of Historic Places in 1997.

It was argued significant partly because it is "the oldest documented metal truss bridge in Nelson County."  It was built in 1904 as a replacement to a bridge named "Sampson Crossing" that was deemed, in 1904, to be "'entirely useless'" by county commissioners.  The low bid for the job was that of Fargo Bridge & Iron Co., for $2,318.

References

Road bridges on the National Register of Historic Places in North Dakota
Bridges completed in 1904
1904 establishments in North Dakota
National Register of Historic Places in Nelson County, North Dakota
Metal bridges in the United States
Truss bridges in the United States
Transportation in Nelson County, North Dakota